The Münchener Beobachter was a völkisch newspaper edited by Rudolf von Sebottendorf. In the course of 1920 it became the official Nazi organ, becoming the Völkischer Beobachter (People's Observer), and remained the leading Nazi party newspaper until 1945. 

On 24 May 1919 Philipp Stauff, a Berlin journalist, good friend of Guido von List and Armanist, wrote an obituary to him which appeared in the Münchener Beobachter called 'Guido von List gestorben', on p. 4.

Nazi newspapers
Newspapers published in Munich
Publications established in 1920
Publications disestablished in 1945